The Civil Air Operations Officers' Association of Australia (CAOOAA), known as Civil Air, is a trade union in Australia. It was founded in 1948 and represents over 1100 air traffic controllers, System Support Officers (SSO), Flight Data Coordinators (FDC) and other support specialists.

Civil Air is affiliated with the Australian Council of Trade Unions, and internationally with the International Federation of Air Traffic Controllers' Associations.

External links
 Civil Air official site.

Trade unions in Australia
Air traffic controllers' trade unions
Trade unions established in 1948
1948 establishments in Australia